The 2021 Pittsburgh Panthers football team  represented the University of Pittsburgh in the 2021 NCAA Division I FBS football season. The Panthers were led by seventh-year head coach Pat Narduzzi and played their home games at Heinz Field. They competed in the Atlantic Coast Conference (ACC). This was Pitt's ninth season as a member of the ACC. The Panthers won the ACC Championship with a record of 11–2 and a 45–21 victory over Wake Forest in the 2021 ACC Championship Game, becoming the first school other than Clemson or Florida State to win the conference championship since Virginia Tech in 2010.

Schedule

Roster

Rankings

Game summaries

UMass

at Tennessee

Western Michigan

No. 21 (FCS) New Hampshire

at Georgia Tech

at Virginia Tech

Clemson

Miami (FL)

at Duke

North Carolina

Virginia

at Syracuse

vs. No. 16 Wake Forest

vs. No. 10 Michigan State

Players drafted into the NFL

References

Pittsburgh
Pittsburgh Panthers football seasons
Atlantic Coast Conference football champion seasons
Pittsburgh Panthers football